is a public co-educational senior high school in Hamakita-ku, Hamamatsu, Japan.

Overview
Hamana High School is a public senior high school with two departments, a full-time day school and a part-time evening school.

History
The school was founded in 1913 as the Kitahama Sewing Cram School for girls. In 1947, the Kitahama High School merged with Kasai Girls' High School and the next year the name was changed to Shizuoka Prefectural Hamana Senior High School.

Chronology

Kitahama Girls' High School
1913: Kitahama Sewing Cram School for girls was founded.
1914: Approval of Kitahama practical course girls' school.
1919: Promotion to Kitahama practical course girls' high school.
1926: School became Kitahama girls' high school.

Kasai Girls' High School
1925: Kasai Vocational School for girls was founded.
1937: Approval of Kasai Vocational High School for girls.
1944: Promotion to Kasai Commercial School for girls.
1946: School became Kasai Girls' High School.

Hamana Senior High School
1947: Kitahama Girls' High School merged with Kasai Girls' High School to become Hamana Girls' High School.
1948: The school was renamed Hamana High School and a part-time course was set up.
1950: The school house was built.
1953: The gymnasium was completed.
1955: Schooling system became a full-time course.
1956: School song was written and adopted.
1962: The new school building was completed in its current location.
1963: It changed to a full-time schooling system, including a general education part with about 300 students, a home economics part with 100 students and a commercial part with 200 students.
1973: The commercial part was closed down. The general education part was increased to 6 classes and the home economics was decreased to 2 classes, 8 classes in total.
1984: The home economics section was closed down.
1995: Construction began on the current school building.
1997: Ceremony to celebrate the completion of the current building.

Calendar of School Events
The Japanese school year begins near the beginning of April and ends in mid-March, with 5–6 weeks of summer vacation from the last week of July to the end of August and about 2 weeks of winter vacation around the New Year's holiday.
April- Entrance Ceremony
June- School Festival
September- Disaster drill, Cultural field trip to watch a play or musical, Sports Festival, School Trip
October- Field trip or school trip
November- Disaster drill, Health Lecture, Traffic Safety Lecture
January- School Marathon
March- Graduation ceremony

Courses

Rigorous Academics Course
In this course, students have supplementary classes every morning before school and two times a week after school in addition to their regular classes. The focus in these classes is on studying. Students in this course aim to enter prestigious national or public universities.

Science Course
In this course, the focus is on the sciences and the curriculum includes many math classes. Students have math classes twice a day on some days.

Literary Course I
In this course, students study all subjects including math and science.

Literary Course II
In this course, there is less emphasis on math and science. Students take classes in art, music, calligraphy or dress design.

School clubs
As in most Japanese high schools, the school clubs at Hamana are mandatory. Students join only one club and generally continue it throughout high school. Students have one opportunity after their first year to change their club. Students finish their club activity requirement after the first semester of their final year to concentrate on studying, the exception being some athletic clubs.

Athletic Clubs
Athletic clubs meet almost every day to practice. Students often practice after school, during holidays and school vacations. 
Soccer
Hamana has a strong soccer team which has competed at the national level multiple times in the All Japan High School Soccer Tournament.
Baseball
Hamana's baseball team also attended at a national event, competing in the 75th Japanese High School Baseball Championship as one of 3 teams representing the Tōkai region in 2003. The baseball team has also participated in the Shizuoka Prefectural Baseball Tournament.
Other athletic clubs, many of which also compete at the prefectural or national level, include volleyball, softball, swimming, track and field, basketball (boys and girls), soft tennis (boys and girls), badminton (boys and girls), and kendo.

Cultural Clubs
There are many cultural clubs at Hamana. These clubs usually meet just one hour a week on Fridays, with the exception being the dance club which meets more often to practice.

List of cultural clubs
English
Math
Dance
Art
Computer
Photography
Handmade
Japanese chess (shogi and go)
Japanese calligraphy
Drama
Tea Ceremony
Flower arrangement
Natural Science
History
Brass band

School Festival
It is held on a Friday and Saturday around the beginning of June. In-school performances are held on Friday with the whole school in attendance. On the Friday morning, there is a dance club performance, a drama club performance and a concert by the school brass band. In the afternoon there are several guest performers for example musicians or comedians. 
On the Saturday morning, the student bands play. The festival is open to the public from mid-morning on Saturday. There are classroom exhibitions from the cultural clubs, including photo and flower arrangements. The dance club and drama club have performances and the English club often performs puppet shows in English. The tea ceremony club offers the experience to try the tea ceremony for a small fee. Visitors can enjoy games created by the computer club members. There are also classroom exhibitions by the second and third grade home rooms which include games and activities for visitors to enjoy.

Alumni

Takahiro Mazuka
Kisho Yano
Masaaki Yanagishita
Takumi Wada
Takuya Matsuura
Masaya Sato

References
Most of the information contained within was translated from the school's informational handbook and the Japanese Wikipedia Page by the Hamana High School English Club students and teachers. Much of the information can also be found on the school's official website.

External links
  
 Hamana High School Brass Band Club in All Japan High School Wind Band Conference (video)

High schools in Shizuoka Prefecture
Buildings and structures in Hamamatsu